The University of Northern British Columbia (UNBC) is a small, research-intensive public university in British Columbia, Canada. The main campus is located in Prince George, with additional campuses located in Prince Rupert, Terrace, Quesnel, and Fort St. John. Because of its northern latitude, UNBC is a member of the University of the Arctic. In the 2020–21 academic year, 4,253 students were enrolled at UNBC.

In 2022, Maclean's magazine ranked UNBC as the number one university of its size in Canada, in the Primarily Undergraduate category. UNBC also finished first in the rankings in 2015 and 2016 and routinely finishes in the top three in its category. In 2023, UNBC placed second in its category. In 2007, the university obtained the trademark for "Canada's Green University".

History
In response to a grass-roots movement spearheaded by the Interior University Society, the Legislative Assembly of British Columbia established the university when it passed Bill 40, the University of Northern British Columbia Act, on June 22, 1990. UNBC offered a limited number of courses in rented office space in 1992 and 1993, but its campus was opened officially by Elizabeth II, Queen of Canada, on 17 August 1994. Some 1,500 students were enrolled that year, upon the completion two years of construction and the opening of the Prince George campus. 

The university gained attention with the introduction of the Northern Medical Program (NMP), a collaboration with the University of British Columbia. Through this arrangement, several academic physicians have been attracted to the city, which has led to an emerging academic medical community.

Organization and administration
The governance was modeled on the provincial University of Toronto Act 1906, which established a bicameral system of university government comprising a Senate (composed of members of the faculty), responsible for academic policy, and a Board of Governors (composed of members of the community), which exercises exclusive control over financial policy and having formal authority in all other matters. The President, appointed by the board, was to provide a link between the two bodies and to perform institutional leadership.

Campus

The Prince George campus is located on Cranbrook Hill, overlooking the city of Prince George from the west, and is widely renowned for its innovative architecture. The award-winning Wood Innovation and Design Centre, designed by Michael Green Architecture, was the world’s tallest modern all-timber structure upon completion and serves as a facility for the research and education on the uses of wood. The Wood Innovation Research Lab is an example of Passive House design in a northern climate.

The separate buildings are linked by an agora that is partially below ground level. It is the efficient heating system connected to all the core campus buildings that permits UNBC to pursue its goal of heating the university by the gasification of clean-burning, renewable wood pellets collected from the waste of pine trees killed by the mountain pine beetle epidemic.

The buildings at UNBC are designed to represent the northern landscape. The Canfor Winter Garden area has a flowing blue staircase below a ceiling of wooden lattices, representing the west coast rain forests. The cafeteria has a lighthouse design that represents the rugged coastline of northern British Columbia. Another structural feature, a pair of triangular glass peaks, represents mountains and functions as skylights above the UNBC Bookstore.

On October 13, 2010, UNBC was co-awarded the Campus Sustainability Leadership Award by the Association for the Advancement of Sustainability in Higher Education (AASHE) for its bio-energy project, which targets a reduction in fossil fuel use by supplying 85% of the heating needs at UNBC.

University Hospital of Northern British Columbia
The University Hospital of Northern British Columbia is a Level III trauma centre in Northern BC.

Culture

Motto
The UNBC motto, 'En cha huná, directly translates as "that person also lives" in the Nak'azdli (Fort St. James) dialect of the Indigenous language Dakelh (Carrier). It is interpreted in English as "respecting all forms of life".

Student life
The Northern Undergraduate Student Society, known colloquially as NUGSS, represents the undergraduate student body at the University of Northern British Columbia. A non-profit organization, NUGSS serves and represents all undergraduate students at all UNBC campuses. The Society governs student-led organizations on campus, provides the health and dental plan, advocates for student needs in local transit, and hosts various events. Annual NUGSS events include Backyard BBQ, Jump Back to NYE, and Final Affair.

UNBC's Student Life department is dedicated to student success, and aims to raise student engagement in the UNBC community. Led by community leaders known as "student ambassadors", Student Life hosts regular events, workshops, and volunteer opportunities for all UNBC students. The Student Life department is also in charge of UNBC's Orientation and Weeks of Welcome.

The Northern British Columbia Graduate Student Society (NBCGSS), represents about 750 full-time and part-time graduate students. It was founded in the year of 1997, less than a decade after UNBC was founded. Every year NBCGSS holds events like winter/semi formals, a ski trip and a summer trip. NBCGSS is a member of the British Columbia Federation of Students (BCFS).

The UNBC First Nations Centre provides support services for indigenous students, including bringing in elders, counselling, and events such as talking circles and sweat lodges. The Northern Pride Centre Society or (also known as the "PC") offers a safe space, support, and resources to the LGBT and ally community, including a new Positive Space Campaign designed by UNBC students.

Student media
 Over the Edge, a bi-weekly student newspaper. Established in 1994.
CFURadio 88.7 FM, the independent campus community radio station.

Athletics

The Timberwolves compete in the Canada West Universities Athletic Association. UNBC fields men's and women's teams in soccer and basketball.

Notable alumni
 James Moore (Member of Parliament and Conservative Cabinet Member)
Currie Dixon, Yukon Legislative Assembly Member (2011–2016), Leader of the Yukon Party and Yukon Legislative Assembly Member (since 2021)

Additional images

Arms

See also
List of universities in British Columbia
Higher education in British Columbia
Education in Canada

References

Further reading

External links

 University of Northern British Columbia
 UNBC History
 UNBC Timberwolves
 UNBC Aboriginal Resource Dati
 Photographs of the UNBC campus
 BC Cancer Society - Centre for the North
 University Hospital of Northern British Columbia (UHNBC)
 Northern Undergraduate Student Society (NUGSS)
 Northern British Columbia Graduate Students' Society
 Over The Edge Newspaper

 
Educational institutions established in 1994
Universities in British Columbia
1994 establishments in British Columbia